MFC Lokomotyv Odesa  (ukr. Міні-Футбольний Клуб "Локомотив" Одеса), is a futsal club from Odesa, Ukraine, and plays in Ukrainian Men's Futsal Championship.

The club was created in June 1993 by former footballer of FC Chornomorets Odesa Anatoliy Koldakov as Odesa-Nord sponsored by local "Nord Bank" (Valeriy Perminov). In September of 1993 Koldakov died due to heart attack.

On April 18, 1998 MFC Lokomotiv Odesa "slammed the door" in his last official match in history by defeating Vuhlyk Makiyivka – 28:4. This victory is still the biggest in the history of Ukrainian futsal.

Honours
 Extra-Liga:
 1995/96, 1996/97, 1997/98
 Ukrainian Futsal Cup:
 1996/97, 1997/98
 Futsal European Clubs Championship
 4-th place: 1997

See also
 FC Lokomotyv Odesa, an association football club

References

External links 
  Footballfacts profile

Futsal clubs in Ukraine
Sport in Odesa
Railway sports teams
Futsal clubs established in 1993
Sports clubs disestablished in 1999
1993 establishments in Ukraine
Southern Railways (Ukraine)